Bogger Mushanga (born 6 June 1952) is a Zambian triple jumper. He competed at the 1978 Commonwealth Games and the 1980 Summer Olympics without reaching the final. In the long jump he finished seventh at the 1978 Commonwealth Games.

References

1952 births
Living people
Zambian male triple jumpers
Athletes (track and field) at the 1978 Commonwealth Games
Commonwealth Games competitors for Zambia
Athletes (track and field) at the 1980 Summer Olympics
Olympic athletes of Zambia
Place of birth missing (living people)